Kenneth Hans Kennholt (born 13 January 1965) is a Swedish former ice hockey defenceman. Kennholt mainly played for Djurgårdens IF and HV71 in the Swedish Elite League. He won four Swedish Championship during his career, three in Djurgården and one in HV71. Kennholt was drafted in 12th round, 252nd overall, by the Calgary Flames in the 1989 NHL Entry Draft.

Career statistics

Regular season and playoffs

International

References

External links

1965 births
Living people
Calgary Flames draft picks
Djurgårdens IF Hockey players
HV71 players
Ice hockey players at the 1992 Winter Olympics
Malmö Redhawks players
Olympic ice hockey players of Sweden
People from Södertälje
Swedish ice hockey defencemen
Sportspeople from Stockholm County